Gustavo Antonio Gelpí Jr. (born December 11, 1965) is an American lawyer who serves as a United States circuit judge of the United States Court of Appeals for the First Circuit. He is a former chief United States district judge of the United States District Court for the District of Puerto Rico.

Early life and career
Born in 1965, in San Juan, Puerto Rico, Gelpí attended high school at Academia del Perpetuo Socorro. He received a Bachelor of Arts degree from Brandeis University in 1987 and a Juris Doctor from Suffolk University Law School in Boston, Massachusetts in 1991. He was a law clerk to Juan Perez-Gimenez of the U.S. District Court for the District of Puerto Rico from 1991 to 1993. Gelpí was then an assistant federal public defender in the office of the federal public defender from 1993 to 1997. He worked in Puerto Rico's Department of Justice from 1997 to 1999, first as an assistant to the attorney general, and then as assistant attorney general for the office of legal counsel. During Puerto Rico Governor Pedro Rosselló's second term, Gelpí served as Puerto Rico's Solicitor General from 1999 to 2000. He was a special litigation counsel in the law firm of McConnell Valdes from January to June in 2001. Since 2008, he has taught the courses "Federal Criminal Practice and Procedure" and "The Constitutional and Historical Development of United States Territories: 1898 - Present" at Interamerican University of Puerto Rico School of Law. Since 2009, he has taught those two courses at University of Puerto Rico School of Law.

Federal judicial service

United States Magistrate Judge service
Gelpí served as a United States magistrate judge of the United States District Court for the District of Puerto Rico from 2001 to 2006.

District court service 
On April 24, 2006, President George W. Bush nominated Gelpí to a seat on the District of Puerto Rico vacated by Hector M. Laffitte, who assumed senior status on November 15, 2005. Gelpí was unanimously confirmed on July 20, 2006, and received his commission on August 1, 2006. He served as Chief Judge from April 13, 2018 to October 20, 2021. His service as a district court judge was terminated on October 20, 2021, when he was elevated to the United States Court of Appeals for the First Circuit.

In 2013, Gelpi began serving a term as the president of the Federal Bar Association.

Court of appeals service 

On May 12, 2021, President Joe Biden nominated Gelpí to be a United States circuit judge of the United States Court of Appeals for the First Circuit, to the seat vacated by Judge Juan R. Torruella, who died on October 26, 2020. On June 23, 2021, a hearing on his nomination was held before the Senate Judiciary Committee. During his confirmation hearing, Gelpí was criticized by Republican senators over his criticism of the insular cases that established Puerto Rico's rights. On July 22, 2021, his nomination was reported out of committee by a 12–10 vote. On October 7, 2021, the United States Senate invoked cloture on his nomination by a 54–39 vote. On October 18, 2021, Gelpí was confirmed by a 52–41 vote. He received his judicial commission on October 19, 2021. He is the second judge of Hispanic origin to serve on the United States Court of Appeals for the First Circuit and the second judge from Puerto Rico ever to sit on the First Circuit.

See also

List of Hispanic/Latino American jurists
List of Puerto Ricans

References

External links

1965 births
Living people
20th-century American lawyers
21st-century American judges
21st-century American lawyers
Brandeis University alumni
Hispanic and Latino American judges
Hispanic and Latino American lawyers
Judges of the United States Court of Appeals for the First Circuit
Judges of the United States District Court for the District of Puerto Rico
People from San Juan, Puerto Rico
Public defenders
Puerto Rican judges
Suffolk University Law School alumni
United States court of appeals judges appointed by Joe Biden
United States district court judges appointed by George W. Bush
United States magistrate judges
University of Puerto Rico faculty